1702 Naval Air Squadron of the Fleet Air Arm of the Royal Navy was formed in June 1945 at RNAS Lee-on-Solent as a Special Service squadron. It was equipped with the Supermarine Sea Otter, and by the end of World War II the squadron remained at Lee-on-Solent.

The squadron joined HMS Trouncer in September 1945 to search for mines in the Mediterranean.

Aircraft flown
1702 Naval Air Squadron flew only one aircraft type:

Supermarine Sea Otter

References

External links
 

1700 series Fleet Air Arm squadrons
Military units and formations established in 1945